John or Jack Dowding may refer to:

John Dowding (Royal Navy officer) (1891–1965), British naval officer of the First and Second World Wars
Jack Dowding (footballer) (1881–1960), Australian rules football player
John Dowding (figure skater) (born 1957), Canadian Olympic skater